= Rahbah =

Coordinates: 15°14′N 48°55′E

Rahحسن الجوهي
- Interactive map of Rahحسن الجوهي
- Country: Yemen
- Governorate: Hadhramaut
- Time zone: UTC+3 (Yemen Standard Time)

Rahbah is a village in eastern Yemen. It is located in the Hadhramaut Governorate.
